Jaia Syvitski (born James Syvitski) is an American-Canadian Professor Emeritus. Their interests include oceanography, geology, hydrology, numerical modelling, and geophysics.

Career 
Syvitski obtained a Bachelor of Science degree in geology and mathematics in 1974, and an Honors degree geology in 1975 from Lakehead University. In 1978, Syvitski received a PhD from the University of British Columbia in oceanography and geology.

After graduation, Syvitski became an Assistant Professor at the University of Calgary. In 1981, Syvitski moved to Halifax, Nova Scotia to work as a Senior Research Scientist for the Bedford Institute of Oceanography with the Canadian Federal Department Natural Resources Canada. During that period Syvitski received appointments as adjunct professor at Canadian Universities: Dalhousie, Laval Universities, Memorial University of Newfoundland and the Institut national de la recherche scientifique of Quebec.

From 1995-2007 Syvitski was Director of the Institute of Arctic and Alpine Research at the University of Colorado, where they were also awarded professorships in geological sciences and geophysics. In 2007, Syvitski became Executive Director of the Community Surface Dynamics Modeling System and Professor of Oceanography, and in 2009 they were also appointed Professor of Applied Math.

Syvitski served as Chair of the International Geosphere-Biosphere Programme for the International Council for Science from 2011-2016. During this time (2013-2015) Syvitski was also part of the Advisory Council in the Department of Oceanography at Xiamen University, and from 2013 they were an International Development Advisor for the International Development Research Centre and Department for International Development.

Professor Syvitski retired in 2018. They have written over 500 publications, including peer-reviewed and popular articles and books.

Awards and honours

References 

Living people
20th-century births
American geologists
American geophysicists
American hydrologists
American oceanographers
University of British Columbia alumni
Academic staff of the Dalhousie University
Academic staff of the Memorial University of Newfoundland
Academic staff of the University of Calgary
Year of birth missing (living people)